Washington Township is one of the fifteen townships of Pickaway County, Ohio, United States.  The 2000 census found 2,951 people in the township.

Geography
Located in the eastern part of the county, it borders the following townships:
Walnut Township - north
Amanda Township, Fairfield County - northeast
Clearcreek Township, Fairfield County - east
Salt Creek Township - southeast corner
Pickaway Township - south
Circleville Township - west

Part of western Washington Township is occupied by the city of Circleville, the county seat of Pickaway County.

Name and history
It is one of forty-three Washington Townships statewide.

Government
The township is governed by a three-member board of trustees, who are elected in November of odd-numbered years to a four-year term beginning on the following January 1. Two are elected in the year after the presidential election and one is elected in the year before it. There is also an elected township fiscal officer, who serves a four-year term beginning on April 1 of the year after the election, which is held in November of the year before the presidential election. Vacancies in the fiscal officership or on the board of trustees are filled by the remaining trustees.

References

External links
County website

Townships in Pickaway County, Ohio
Townships in Ohio